Jean Guitton (August 18, 1901 – March 21, 1999) was a French Catholic philosopher and theologian.

Biography
Born in Saint-Étienne, Loire in August 1901, he studied at the Lycée du Parc in Lyon and was accepted at the École Normale Supérieure in Paris in 1920. His principal religious and intellectual influence was from a blind priest, Francois Pouget. He finished his philosophical studies in the early 1920s and later became a professor in many French universities. During World War II, he was made a war prisoner by the Nazis. In the year 1954, he earned a literary award from the Académie française. From 1955 to 1968 he continued his works as a professor of philosophy at the Sorbonne. He became a member of the Académie française in 1961.

Invited as an observer to the ecumenical council of Vatican II, the first lay person to be granted this honor, he would become a close friend of Pope Paul VI.

He died in Paris at 97 in 1999. During his life, he was also awarded the Great Cross of the National Order of Merit, Commander of the Légion d'Honneur and of the Arts and Letters Medal.

In most of his works Jean Guitton writes about and discusses the agnostic confrontation between human faith and human logic. He wrote around fifty books.

Works
 Portrait d'une mère (1933)
 Le Temps et l'éternité chez Plotin et Saint Augustin (1933)
 La Philosophie de Leibniz (1933)
 Actualité de saint Augustin (1935)
 La Pensée moderne et le catholicisme (1934-1950) 
 Perspectives (1934)
 Newman et Renan (1938)
 La Pensée de M. Loisy (1936)
 Critique de la critique (1937)
 Le Problème de la connaissance et de la pensée religieuse
 Le Problème de Jésus et le fondement du témoignage chrétien (1946)
 Développement des idées dans l'Ancien Testament (1947)
 Portrait de M. Pouget (1941)
 Justification du temps (1941)
 Fondements de la communauté française (1942)
 Journal de captivité 1942-1943 (1942-1943)
 Nouvel art de penser (1946)
 Le Problème de Jésus (1946)
 L'Amour humain (1948)
 L'Existence temporelle (1949)
 La Vierge Marie (1949)
 Pascal et Leibniz (1951)
 Le Travail intellectuel (1951)
 Journal, études et rencontres (1959 et 1968)
 L'Église et l'Évangile (1959)
 La Vocation de Bergson (1960)
 Une mère dans sa vallée (1961)
 Regard sur le concile (1962)
 Génie de Pascal (1962)
 L'Église et les laïcs (1963)
 La conversion de Ratisbonne (1964)
 Le Clair et l'Obscur (1964)
 Dialogues avec Paul VI (1967)
 Développement de la pensée occidentale (1968)
 Profils parallèles (1970) 
 Newman et Renan
 Pascal et Leibniz
 Teilhard et Bergson
 Claudel et Heidegger
 Ce que je crois (1971)
 Paul VI et l'Année sainte (1974)
 Écrire comme on se souvient (1974)
 Remarques et réflexions sur l'Histoire (1976)
 Journal de ma vie (1976)
 Évangile et mystère du temps (1977)
 L'Évangile dans ma vie (1978)
 Paul VI secret (1980)
 Le Temps d'une vie (1980)
 Jugements (1981)
 Pages brûlées (1984)
 L'Absurde et le Mystère (1984)
 Portrait de Marthe Robin (1985)
 Œcuménisme (1986)
 Un siècle, une vie(1988), 13th Prix Fondation Pierre-Lafue 1989
 Dieu et la science (with Igor and Grichka Bogdanoff, 1991)
 Portrait du père Lagrange (1992)
 Celui qui croyait au ciel et celui qui n'y croyait pas (with Jacques Lanzmann, 1994)
 Lumen de lumine (1994)
 Chaque jour que Dieu fait (1996)
 Le Siècle qui s'annonce (1996)
 Mon testament philosophique (1997)
 Ultima Verba (with Gérard Prévost, 1998)
 Le livre de la sagesse et des vertus retrouvées (1998)

References

External links
Jean Guitton Biography at the Académie française Website (French)

1901 births
1999 deaths
Writers from Saint-Étienne
Lycée Louis-le-Grand alumni
École Normale Supérieure alumni
Academic staff of the University of Paris
French Roman Catholic writers
Catholic philosophers
20th-century French philosophers
Members of the Académie Française
Members of the Académie des sciences morales et politiques
Commandeurs of the Ordre des Arts et des Lettres
Commandeurs of the Légion d'honneur
Grand Cross of the Ordre national du Mérite
French male writers
20th-century French Catholic theologians
20th-century French male writers